Riverview, Maryland may refer to:

Riverview, Baltimore County, Maryland
Riverview, Prince George's County, Maryland
Riverview, Queen Anne's County, Maryland